Flat Rock Creek or Flatrock Creek may refer to one of the following rivers:
Flat Rock Creek (Texas) in Kendall County, Texas
Flatrock Creek (Apple Creek), a stream in Missouri
Flat Rock Creek (Oklahoma) in Wagoner County, Oklahoma
Flatrock Creek (Auglaize River) in northeastern Indiana and northwestern Ohio
Flatrock River (Indiana), sometimes also known as Flatrock Creek